Máximo Mosquera Zegarra (8 January 1928 – 27 July 2016) was a Peruvian footballer who played as a striker.

Career
Born in Chincha Alta, Mosquera played for Deportivo Municipal, Deportivo Cali, Alianza Lima, Sporting Cristal, Atlético Baleares and Cádiz. He won the Peruvian Primera División with Deportivo Municipal (1943), Alianza Lima (1952, 1954, 1955), and Sporting Cristal (1956). In the 1955 season he was the top scorer in the league, with 11 goals.

He was a member of the Peruvian national team between 1947 and 1957.

Later life and death
He later worked as a radio commentator, and died on 27 July 2016.

References

1928 births
2016 deaths
Peruvian footballers
Peru international footballers
Categoría Primera A players
Peruvian Primera División players
Segunda División players
Deportivo Municipal footballers
Deportivo Cali footballers
Club Alianza Lima footballers
Sporting Cristal footballers
CD Atlético Baleares footballers
Cádiz CF players
Association football forwards
Peruvian expatriate footballers
Peruvian expatriate sportspeople in Colombia
Expatriate footballers in Colombia
Peruvian expatriate sportspeople in Spain
Expatriate footballers in Spain